Sayranovo (Säyrän) is a rural locality (a selo) and the administrative centre of Sayranovsky Selsoviet, Tuymazinsky District, Bashkortostan, Russia. The population was 688 as of 2010. There are 3 streets.

Geography 
Sayranovo is located 46 km southeast of Tuymazy (the district's administrative centre) by road. Urnyak is the nearest rural locality.

References 

Rural localities in Tuymazinsky District